The Columbus Limestone is a mapped bedrock unit consisting primarily of fossiliferous limestone, and it occurs in Ohio, Pennsylvania, and Virginia in the United States, and in Ontario, Canada.

Description

Depositional environment
The depositional environment was most likely shallow marine.

Stratigraphy
The Columbus conformably overlies the Lucas Dolomite in northeastern Ohio, and unconformably overlies other dolomite elsewhere.  It unconformably underlies the Ohio Shale in northwestern Ohio and the Delaware Limestone in eastern Ohio.

Its members include: Bellepoint, Marblehead, Tioga Ash Bed, Venice, Delhi, Klondike, and East Liberty.

Notable Exposures
The type section is located in Columbus, Ohio.
The glacial grooves on Kelleys Island are cut into the Columbus Limestone.  It is also quarried there.
An exposure in Ontario is located at Ingersoll, Ontario.

Fossils
The Columbus Limestone contains brachiopods, trilobites, bryozoans, mollusks, corals, stromatoporoids and echinoderms (including crinoids).

Due to their mid-continent depositional environment, the fossils are almost free of deformation caused by tectonic activity common in the Appalachian Mountains.

Tabulate corals include Syringopora tabulata, Favosites hemispherica minuta, Emmonsia polymorpha, Thamnoptychia alternans, Pleurodictyum sp., and Coenites dublinensis. Rugose corals include Prismatophyllum rugosum, Hexagonaria anna, Eridophyllum seriale, Synaptophyllum simcoense, Amplexus yandelli, Zaphrenthis perovalis, Heterophrentis nitida, Cystiphylloides americanum, Odontophyllum convergens, Siphonophrentis gigantea.

Brachiopods include Spirifer macrothyris and Brevispirifer gregarius (see Spiriferida).  The gastropod (snail) Laevidentalhum martinei is present, as well as the crinoid Nucleocrinus verneulli.

Fish fossils have been found in the East Liberty Member ("East Liberty bone bed").

Goniatites have been found in the Columbus, including Werneroceras staufferi and Tornoceras eberlei. Another cephalopod species is Goldringia cyclops.

Age
Relative age dating of the Columbus Limestone places it in the Early to Middle Devonian period.

Economic Uses
The Columbus has been mined for aggregate. Its Calcium carbonate content is 90% or higher.

References

See also
List of types of limestone

Devonian Ohio
Limestone